The Protestant Alliance Friendly Society was a friendly society that operated in many states of Australia, with branches in many towns and districts. The motto of the society was "Fear God, Love the Brotherhood, Honour the King".

Like most friendly societies, one of the benefits of membership was to receive payments to assist during illness and, in the event of a member's death, payments toward funeral expenses and pensions to support the member's widow and children. Although membership was initially only open to adult men, women and juveniles were later permitted to join the society.

References 

Friendly societies
Religious organisations based in Australia